The 2010–11 LNBP was the 11th season of the Liga Nacional de Baloncesto Profesional, one of the professional basketball leagues of Mexico. It started on September 2, 2010 and ended on March 1, 2011. The league title was won by Toros de Nuevo Laredo, which defeated Pioneros de Quintana Roo in the championship series, 4–2.

Format 
18 teams participate. All the teams played against each other and the standings included all 18 teams with no separation in groups. The first 12 teams qualify for the playoffs. The playoffs have a first round (best-of-5), a second round (best-of-5), semifinals (best-of-7) and finals (best-of-7).

Teams

Regular season

Standings 

Note 1: Ola Verde de Poza Rica and Algodoneros de la Comarca retired before the end of the season, and were therefore ranked at the bottom of the table.
Note 2: Jaguares de la Bahía moved to Saltillo in the state of Coahuila in October and took the name Saltillo.

Playoffs

First round 
The team seed is indicated after the team name.

 Pioneros de Quintana Roo (1) defeats Abejas de Guanajuato (12), 3–0
 Fuerza Regia de Monterrey (2) defeats Potros ITSON de Obregón (11), 3–2
 Halcones UV Xalapa (3) defeats Soles de Mexicali (10), 3–0
 Halcones Rojos Veracruz (4) defeats Lobos Grises de la UAD (9), 3–0
 Toros de Nuevo Laredo (5) defeats Huracanes de Tampico (8), 3–2
 Ángeles de Puebla (6) defeats Lechugueros de León (7), 3–0

Second round 
 Pioneros de Quintana Roo (1) defeats Ángeles de Puebla (6), 3–1
 Toros de Nuevo Laredo (5) defeats Fuerza Regia de Monterrey (2), 3–1
 Halcones UB Xalapa (3) defeats Halcones Rojos Veracruz (4), 3–2

Semifinals 
Note: Fuerza Regia is qualified to the semifinals as the best losing team.

References

External links 
 2010–11 LNBP season on Latinbasket.com

LNBP seasons
2010 in Mexican sports
2011 in Mexican sports
2010–11 in North American basketball